Iman Barlow (born 14 April 1993) is a  professional English female kickboxer and Muay Thai fighter.

She is the former two time Enfusion 54 kg World champion with six successful title defenses, the former WRSA World champion, former Lion Fight Super Bantamweight champion., and the former WPMF World Bantamweight champion. She has fought Sofia Olofsson for the World Muaythai Council world title.

In May 2020, Combat Press ranked her #3 female fighter in the world, while WBC Muaythai ranked her #3 Super Bantamweight in the world in April 2020.

In 2013 Awakening Fighters voted her Fighter of the Year, Inspirational Fighter of the Year and awarded her the Fight of the Year (vs.  Filipa Correia). In 2019 WBC Muaythai voted her the Female Fighter of the Year.

In October 2019, Barlow signed multi fight deal with ONE Championship for the next 24 months. She made her promotional debut in March 2022.

Kickboxing career
Barlow began kickboxing at a young age, winning the IKF Junior British and European titles at just 9 years of age.

She made her professional debut in 2008, when she fought Evelina Adomulyte. She won the fight in the fourth round, by TKO due to punches. In the same year, she fought Denephar, and won a unanimous decision to clinch her  first major honor, the S1 Bantamweight World title. She would later name Denephar as the best opponent she ever fought.

Barlow fought Nathalie Visschers for the WKA Muay Thai Bantamweight World title in 2009. She won a unanimous decision.

Over the next four years she amassed a 12-1-1 record. Denephar would give Barlow her first professional loss, by a unanimous decision. During this time Barlow achieved notable wins over Meryem Uslu, Teresa Wintermyr, Amy Pirnie, and Mellony Geugjes.

This winning streak culminated in a chance to fight for the Enfusion 54 kg World title against Alexis Rufus. Barlow won a unanimous decision. She would lose a split decision to Eva Naranjo in her first title defense.

A year later she faced Maritzarda Hersisia for the Golden Belt Bantamweight World title. Barlow won the fight with a high kick knockout in the second round. In the same year she defeated Linda Mancini to win the World Ring Sports Association Bantamweight belt, as well as winning a unanimous decision against Iman Ghbalou Chairi to once again win the Enfusion 54 kg World title.

She would subsequently enter the Enfusion K1 tournament. After beating Simone van Dommelen, Samantha van Doorn and Marina Zueva, she faced Anissa Meksen in the finals. Meksen won the fight with a second-round knockout.

She defended her Enfusion title in a rematch with Samantha van Doorn, her second defense would be against Veronika Petríková, and the third against Ilsury Hendrikse.

She won a unanimous decision win over Jeri Sitzes to win the Lion Fight Super Bantamweight World title, and a unanimous decision win over Meryem Uslu to defend the Lion Fight title.

In 2017 she scored a KO win over Therese Gunnarsson to win the Bantamweight Muay Thai Grand Prix.

Barlow once against defended her Enfusion title, with a split decision win over Ashley Nichols.

During Rumble of the Kings 18, she challenged Sofia Olofsson for the WMC Bantamweight World Championship. Olofsson won a unanimous decision.

Barlow's next Enfusion 54 kg title defense came against Lara Fernandez. She won a unanimous decision.

Barlow's eight Enfusion title defense came during Enfusion 82, when she fought Delphine Guénon. Barlow won a unanimous decision.

In November 2019, Barlow fought Brooke Farrell for the WBC Muaythai International title and won a unanimous decision.

ONE Championship 
Barlow was booked to face Daniela Lopez at ONE: Lights Out on March 11, 2022. She won the fight by doctor stoppage in the first round.

Barlow is scheduled to face Ekaterina Vandaryeva on March 25, 2023, at ONE Fight Night 8.

Championships and accomplishments

Amateur titles
International Kickboxing Federation
IKF 2002 Junior British Championship
IKF 2002 Junior European Championship
World Kickboxing Association
WKA 2009 Kickboxing World Championship
WKA 2009 K-1 World Championship
World Games
 2022 IFMA Muay Thai at the World Games -57kg 
International Federation of Muaythai Associations
 2021 IFMA World Championships −57 kg

Professional titles
World Kickboxing Association
WKA Muay Thai Bantamweight World Championship
World Ring Sports Association
WRSA 54 kg World Championship 
World Professional MuayThai Federation
WPMF World Bantamweight Championship (One time, former)
Lion Fight
Lion Fight 54 kg World Championship (One time, current)
One successful title defense
Enfusion
Enfusion 54 kg World Championship (Two times, former)
Six successful title defenses
Record number of title defenses  (6)
Most consecutive title defenses (6)
Longest serving Enfusion champion (1924 days)
World Boxing Council Muaythai
WBC International Muaythai 54 kg World Championship (One time, current)

Kickboxing and Muay Thai record

|-  style="background:#;"
| 2023-03-25 || ||align=left| Ekaterina Vandaryeva || ONE Fight Night 8 || Kallang, Singapore || ||  || || 
|-

|-  style="background:#cfc;"
| 2022-12-03|| Win ||align=left| Atenea Flores || Muay Thai Addict League 3 || Leicester, England || Decision || 5 || 3:00 || 
|-
! style=background:white colspan=9 |

|-  style="background:#cfc;"
| 2022-03-11|| Win ||align=left| Daniela Lopez || ONE: Lights Out || Kallang, Singapore || TKO (doctor stoppage) || 1 || 1:39 ||  
|-
|-  style="background:#cfc;"
| 2021-10-09|| Win ||align=left| Sveva Melillo || Road to ONE: Muay Thai Grand Prix || London, England || Decision || 5 || 3:00 ||  
|-
! style=background:white colspan=9 |
|-  style="background:#cfc;"
| 2019-11-30 || Win||align=left| Brooke Farrell || Muay Thai Grand Prix 32 || Melville, Australia || Decision (unanimous) || 5 || 3:00 || 
|-
! style=background:white colspan=9 |
|-  style="background:#cfc;"
| 2019-10-12 || Win||align=left| Cindy Silvestre || A Night of Muay Thai VII || Melton Mowbray, England || TKO (doctor stoppage) || 3 ||  || 
|-
|-  style="background:#cfc;"
| 2019-04-13 || Win||align=left| Delphine Guénon || Eunfusion Live 82 || Orchies, France || Decision (unanimous) || 5 || 3:00 || 
|-
! style=background:white colspan=9 |
|-  style="background:#cfc;"
| 2018-11-10 || Win||align=left| Hannah Brady || Muay Thai Grand Prix 21 || London, England || Decision (unanimous) || 3 || 3:00 || 
|-
|-  style="background:#cfc;"
| 2018-06-09 || Win||align=left| Lara Fernandez || Eunfusion Live 69 || Newcastle, England || Decision (unanimous) || 5 || 3:00 || 
|-
! style=background:white colspan=9 |
|-  style="background:#cfc;"
| 2018-04-14 || Win||align=left| Yolanda Schmidt || Dynamite Muay Thai - Dynamite NAKSOO Female Fight Tour: Melbourne 3.0 || Melbourne, Australia || Decision (unanimous) || 3 || 3:00 || 
|-
|-  style="background:#cfc;"
| 2018-03-03 || Win||align=left| Jleana Valentino || A Night Of Muay Thai V || Melton Mowbray, England || Decision (unanimous) || 3 || 3:00 || 
|-
|-  style="background:#fbb;"
| 2017-11-25 || Loss ||align=left| Sofia Olofsson || Rumble of the Kings 18: Uprising || Gothenburg, Sweden || Decision (unanimous) || 5 || 3:00 || 
|-
! style=background:white colspan=9 |
|-  style="background:#cfc;"
| 2017-10-14 || Win ||align=left| Cindy Silvestre || A Night Of Muay Thai III || Melton Mowbray, England || Decision (unanimous) || 3 || 3:00 || 
|-
|-  style="background:#cfc;"
| 2017-08-26 || Win ||align=left| Ranee Klinratree|| Ladies Fight Night 6 || Rawa Mazowiecka, Poland || Decision (unanimous) || 3 || 3:00 || 
|-
|-  style="background:#cfc;"
| 2017-07-08 || Win ||align=left| Ashley Nichols || Enfusion Live 51|| Halifax, Nova Scotia, United States || Decision (split) || 5 || 2:00 || 
|-
! style=background:white colspan=9 |
|-  style="background:#cfc;"
| 2017-04-01 || Win ||align=left| Therese Gunnarsson || Muay Thai Grand Prix 7: Indigo at the O2 || London, England || TKO (knees to the body) || 5 || 1:40 || 
|-
! style=background:white colspan=9 |
|-  style="background:#cfc;"
| 2017-02-03 || Win ||align=left| Meryem Uslu || Lion Fight 34 || Las Vegas, Nevada, United States || Decision (unanimous) || 5 || 3:00 || 
|-
! style=background:white colspan=9 |
|-  style="background:#cfc;"
| 2016-11-20 || Win ||align=left| Ilsury Hendrikse || Enfusion Live 43 || Groningen, Netherlands || Decision (unanimous) || 5 || 3:00 || 
|-
! style=background:white colspan=9 |
|-  style="background:#cfc;"
| 2016-09-02 || Win ||align=left| Jeri Sitzes || Lion Fight 31 || Mashantucket, Connecticut, United States || Decision (unanimous) || 5 || 3:00 || 
|-
! style=background:white colspan=9 |
|-  style="background:#cfc;"
| 2016-04-23 || Win ||align=left| Veronika Petríková || Enfusion Live 39 || Zilina, Slovakia || Decision (unanimous) || 5 || 3:00 || 
|-
! style=background:white colspan=9 |
|-  style="background:#cfc;"
| 2016-03-26 || Win ||align=left| Maria Lobo || Muay Thai Grand Prix 3 || London, England || Decision (unanimous) || 3 || 3:00 || 
|-
|-  style="background:#cfc;"
| 2016-02-20 || Win ||align=left| Maribel de Sousa || K-1 event in England || Leicestershire, England || Decision (unanimous) || 3 || 3:00 || 
|-
|-  style="background:#cfc;"
| 2015-12-11 || Win ||align=left| Alicia Pestana || Onyx Fight Promotions: Thunderdome XIII || Perth, Australia || Decision (unanimous) || 5 || 3:00 || 
|-
|-  style="background:#cfc;"
| 2015-11-07 || Win ||align=left| Samantha van Doorn || Enfusion Live 30 || Dublin, Ireland || Decision (unanimous) || 5 || 3:00 || 
|-
! style=background:white colspan=9 |
|-  style="background:#cfc;"
| 2015-10-24 || Win ||align=left| Fatima Pinto || Muay Thai event in England || Leicestershire, England || TKO || 1 ||  || 
|-
|-  style="background:#cfc;"
| 2015-05-02 || Win ||align=left| Xu Zhurong || K-1 event in China || Zhengzhou, China || Decision (unanimous) || 3 || 3:00 || 
|- 
|-  style="background:#cfc;"
| 2015-03-00 || Win ||align=left| Therese Gunnarsson || Muay Thai event in England || Leicestershire, England || Decision (unanimous) || 5 || 3:00 || 
|-
|-  style="background:#cfc;"
| 2014-12-21 || Win ||align=left| Soraya Haurissa || Enfusion Live 23 || Antwerp, Belgium || Decision (unanimous) || 3 || 3:00 || 
|-
! style=background:white colspan=9 |
|-  style="background:#fbb;"
| 2014-09-23 || Loss ||align=left| Anissa Meksen || Enfusion Reality Season 5: Victory of the Vixen || Ko Samui, Thailand || KO (punch) || 2 || || 
|-
! style=background:white colspan=9 |
|-  style="background:#cfc;"
| 2014-09-23 || Win ||align=left| Marina Zueva || Enfusion Reality Season 5: Victory of the Vixen || Ko Samui, Thailand || TKO ||  || || 
|-
! style=background:white colspan=9 |
|-  style="background:#cfc;"
| 2014-09-23 || Win ||align=left| Samantha van Doorn || Enfusion Reality Season 5: Victory of the Vixen || Ko Samui, Thailand || Decision ||  || || 
|-
! style=background:white colspan=9 |
|-  style="background:#cfc;"
| 2014-09-18 || Win ||align=left| Simone van Dommelen || Enfusion Reality Season 5: Victory of the Vixen || Ko Samui, Thailand || Decision ||  || || 
|-
! style=background:white colspan=9 |
|-  style="background:#cfc;"
| 2014-07-12 || Win ||align=left| Iman Ghbalou Chairi || Enfusion Live 20 || Mallorca, Spain || Decision (unanimous) || 5 || 3:00 || 
|-
! style=background:white colspan=9 |
|-  style="background:#cfc;"
| 2014-05-31 || Win ||align=left| Linda Mancini || World Ring Sports Association Muay Thai Event || Leicestershire, England || Points || 5 || 3:00 || 
|-
! style=background:white colspan=9 |
|-  style="background:#cfc;"
| 2014-03-22 || Win ||align=left| Lorena Klijn || Enfusion Live 15 || Dublin, Ireland || Decision (unanimous) || 3 || 3:00 || 
|-
|-  style="background:#cfc;"
| 2014-02-22 || Win ||align=left| Maritzarda Hersisia || Muay Thai event in England || Leicestershire, England || KO (high kick) || 2 || 1:04 || 
|-
! style=background:white colspan=9 |
|-  style="background:#cfc;"
| 2014-01-25 || Win ||align=left| Adi Rotem || Enfusion Live 13 || Eindhoven, Netherlands || Decision (unanimous) || 3 || 3:00 || 
|-
|-  style="background:#cfc;"
| 2013-12-01 || Win ||align=left| Marina Zueva || Enfusion Live 11 || London, England || Decision (unanimous) || 3 || 3:00 || 
|-
|-  style="background:#cfc;"
| 2013-10-12 || Win ||align=left| Filipa De Oliveira Correia || Enfusion Live 8 || London, England || Decision (unanimous) || 3 || 3:00 || 
|-
|-  style="background:#fbb;"
| 2013-07-13 || Loss ||align=left| Eva Naranjo || Enfusion Live 7 || Tenerife, Spain || Decision (split) || 4 || 3:00 || 
|-
! style=background:white colspan=9 |
|-  style="background:#cfc;"
| 2013-06-29 || Win ||align=left| Hayley-Jayne Houguez || Lock in Muay Thai || Saint Peter Port, Guernsey || Decision (unanimous) || 5 || 2:00 || 
|-
|-  style="background:#cfc;"
| 2013-06-01 || Win ||align=left| Fani Peloumpi || Team Assassins Event || Leicestershire, England || Decision (unanimous) || 5 || 2:00 || 
|-
|-  style="background:#cfc;"
| 2013-03-30 || Win ||align=left| Alexis Rufus || Enfusion Live 3 || London, England || Decision (unanimous) || 5 || 3:00 || 
|-
! style=background:white colspan=9 |
|-  style="background:#cfc;"
| 2013-03-09 || Win ||align=left| Maribel de Sousa || Enfusion Live 2 || Barcelona, Spain || Decision (unanimous) || 3 || 3:00 || 
|-
|-  style="background:#cfc;"
| 2012-11-24 || Win ||align=left| Marlene Caneva || Cardiff City FC || Cardiff, Wales || TKO (retirement) || 2 || 3:00 || 
|-
|-  style="background:#c5d2ea;"
| 2012-10-00 || Draw ||align=left| Sawsing Sor Sopit || Muay Thai event in Thailand || Pattaya, Thailand || Draw || 3 || 3:00 || 
|-
|-  style="background:#cfc;"
| 2012-05-20 || Win ||align=left| Ferial Ameeroedien || King of the Ring 17 || Nottingham, England || Points || 3 || 3:00 || 
|-
|-  style="background:#cfc;"
| 2012-03-31 || Win ||align=left| Kelsey van de Poll || Xplosion Fight Series || London, England || TKO (knee to the body) || 2 || 1:00 || 
|-
|-  style="background:#cfc;"
| 2012-02-00 || Win ||align=left| Mellony Geugjes || Muay Thai event in England || Leicestershire, England || Points || 3 || 3:00 || 
|-
|-  style="background:#cfc;"
| 2011-11-26 || Win ||align=left| Lizzie Largillière || Low Kick Muay Thai || Paris, France || Points || 3 || 3:00 || 
|-
|-  style="background:#cfc;"
| 2011-11-12 || Win ||align=left| Lanchana Green || Xplosion Fight Series || Greenwich, England || TKO (punches and high kick) || 3 || || 
|-
|-  style="background:#cfc;"
| 2011-10-15 || Win ||align=left| Johanna Rydberg || Muay Thai event in England || Leicestershire, England || Points || 3 || 3:00 || 
|-
|-  style="background:#cfc;"
| 2011-09-17 || Win ||align=left| Amy Pirnie || Muay Thai event in Scotland || Glasgow, Scotland || TKO (body punch) || 2 || || 
|-
|-  style="background:#cfc;"
| 2011-08-28 || Win ||align=left| Teresa Wintermyr || Muay Thai event in Thailand || Phuket, Thailand || Decision || 5 || 2:00 || 
|-
|-  style="background:#cfc;"
| 2011-05-07 || Win ||align=left| Meryem Uslu || Muay Thai event in England || Leicestershire, England || Points || 3 || 3:00 || 
|-
|-  style="background:#cfc;"
| 2011-02-00 || Win ||align=left|  || Muay Thai Event in Latvia || Latvia  || KO || 1 || || 
|-
|-  style="background:#fbb;"
| 2009-08-00 || Loss ||align=left| Denephar || Muay Thai Event in Thailand || Bangkok, Thailand || Points || 3 || 3:00 || 
|-
|-  style="background:#cfc;"
| 2009-00-00 || Win ||align=left| Nathalie Visschers ||  ||  || Points ||  || || 
|- 
! style=background:white colspan=9 |
|-  style="background:#cfc;"
| 2008-08-00 || Win ||align=left| Denephar || S1 Event || Bangkok, Thailand || Points || 5 || 3:00 || 
|-
! style=background:white colspan=9 |
|-  style="background:#c5d2ea;"
| 2008-00-00 || Draw ||align=left| Amy Pirnie || Muay Thai event in Scotland || Glasgow, Scotland || Draw || 3 || 3:00 || 
|-
|-  style="background:#cfc;"
| 2008-00-00 || Win ||align=left| Maria Curriki || Muay Thai event in England || Leicestershire, England || Points ||  || || 
|-
|-  style="background:#cfc;"
| 2008-00-00 || Win ||align=left| Karla Benitez || Muay Thai event in England || Leicestershire, England || Points ||  || || 
|-
|-  style="background:#cfc;"
| 2008-00-00 || Win ||align=left| Silvija Morkanaite || Muay Thai event in Lithuania || Lithuania  || TKO (low kicks) ||  || || 
|-
|-  style="background:#cfc;"
| 2008-00-00 || Win ||align=left| Evelina Adomulyte || Muay Thai event in Lithuania || Lithuania  || TKO (punches) || 4 || || 
|-
|-

|-  style="background:#cfc;"
| 2022-07-17 || Win ||align=left| Tierra Brandt || 2022 World Games, Tournament Final || Birmingham, Alabama, U.S. || Decision (Unanimous) || 3 || 3:00  
|-
! style=background:white colspan=9 |
|-
|-  style="background:#cfc;"
| 2022-07-16 || Win ||align=left| Patricia Axling || 2022 World Games, Tournament Semifinal || Birmingham, Alabama, U.S. || Decision (Unanimous) || 3 || 3:00  
|-
|-  style="background:#cfc;"
| 2022-07-15 || Win ||align=left| Matilde Rodrigues || 2022 World Games, Tournament Quarterfinal || Birmingham, Alabama, U.S. || Decision (Unanimous) || 3 || 3:00  
|-
|-  style="background:#cfc;"
| 2021-12-11 || Win ||align=left| Anaëlle Angerville || 2021 IFMA World Championships, Tournament Final || Kuala Lumpur, Malaysia || Decision (Unanimous) || 3 || 3:00  
|-
! style=background:white colspan=9 |
|-
|-  style="background:#cfc;"
| 2021-12-10 || Win ||align=left| Patricia Axling || 2021 IFMA World Championships, Tournament Semifinal || Kuala Lumpur, Malaysia || Decision (Unanimous) || 3 || 3:00  
|-
|-  style="background:#cfc;"
| 2021-12-07|| Win ||align=left| Priya Sharma || 2021 IFMA World Championships, Tournament Quarterfinal || Kuala Lumpur, Malaysia || Decision (Unanimous) || 2 || 3:00  
|-
|-  style="background:#cfc;"
| 2009-00-00 || Win ||align=left| Ingrid Stevenson || WKA 2009 K-1 World Championship || Spain || Points ||  ||  
|-
! style=background:white colspan=9 |
|-  style="background:#cfc;"
| 2009-00-00 || Win ||align=left| Lisa Hartman || WKA 2009 Kickboxing World Championship || Spain || TKO (punches) ||  ||  
|-
! style=background:white colspan=9 |
|-  style="background:#cfc;"
| 2006-00-00 || Win ||align=left| Sandra || Team Assassins Event || England || KO (punches) || 1 ||  
|-
|-  style="background:#cfc;"
| 2002-11-16 || Win ||align=left| Donna Price || IKF 2002 Junior European Championship || Leicestershire, England || Decision (unanimous) ||  ||  
|-
! style=background:white colspan=9 |
|-  style="background:#cfc;"
| 2002-06-23 || Win ||align=left| Jessica Isaac || IKF 2002 Junior British Championship || Liverpool, England || Decision (unanimous) ||  ||  
|-
! style=background:white colspan=9 |
|-
| colspan=9 | Legend:

See also
List of female kickboxers

References

External links
 Iman Barlow at Awakening Fighters

1993 births
Living people
English female kickboxers
English Muay Thai practitioners
Female Muay Thai practitioners
Sportspeople from Melton Mowbray
English women boxers
Bantamweight kickboxers
ONE Championship kickboxers